Sergei Pavlovich Baltacha (born 17 February 1958) is a Ukrainian former professional football player and coach who won 45 caps for the Soviet Union and made nearly 300 appearances for Dynamo Kyiv.

Life and career 
Baltacha was developed by the famous coach Valeriy Lobanovskyi from Dynamo Kyiv hero and one of the most respected football coaches of the 20th century. He was spotted by the Dynamo boss while still a teenager at the Kharkiv Oblast sports boarding school (today the Kharkiv College of Sports) of footballing excellence which he had left home to attend at the age of 13 Before moving to Kharkiv, Baltacha started his football career in native Mariupol playing for local youth sports club "Azovstal". While being officially invited to Dynamo, in 1976 Baltacha spent his first season on loan playing for Metalist Kharkiv which at that time was playing at the third tier and his second season in Dynamo's reserves. It wasn't until 1978 when he finally made his debut for the Dynamo's first team that was hosting Spartak Moscow on 28 April 1978.

As preparation to the 1980 Summer Olympics, in 1979 Baltacha played couple of games for Ukraine at the Spartakiad of the Peoples of the USSR.

Baltacha was on the winning side in the Cup Winners' Cup in 1986, the Soviet Top League and Soviet Cup four times, and the Soviet Super Cup on three occasions. He also appeared in the FIFA World Cup in 1982, was a finalist in the European Championships in 1988 and won the bronze medal at the 1980 Summer Olympics in Moscow

As the Soviet government eased restrictions on traveling abroad for athletes, in 1988 at his 30 Baltacha traveled to England and Scotland, playing for Ipswich Town and St Johnstone. His debut for Ipswich (in which he scored) was the first time a Soviet international had played in the Football League. He also had a spell as player manager of Inverness Caledonian in the Scottish Highland Football League, and was with Caledonian when they amalgamated with Inverness Thistle and entered the Scottish Football League in 1994 as Caledonian Thistle.

Baltacha worked as a physical education teacher and tutor at Bacon's College in South East London until 2012, having formerly been a physical education teacher at Geoffrey Chaucer Technology College (Old Kent Road, London) and a coach at the Charlton Athletic academy. Since 2012 Sergei Baltacha works as Professional Development Phase Lead Coach at the Charlton Athletic FC Academy

Personal life 
His former wife, Olga, master of sports in athletics, could have been on the Soviet olympic pentathlon team in 1980 Summer Olympics, but instead opted to remain at home to care for her one-year-old son.

Their daughter Elena was a professional tennis player. She died on 4 May 2014, of liver cancer, aged 30.

Baltacha was married to Oksana. His and Olga's son, Sergei Jr, was also a professional footballer, who played for St Mirren and Millwall as well as being capped at U-21 level for Scotland.

Born in the Ukrainian part of the Soviet Union, Baltacha regards himself to be multi-national. His career achievements resulted in him being inducted into the Viktor Leonenko Hall of Fame in March 2012. Baltacha has stated in interview "I’m a citizen of the Soviet Union, but I love Ukraine. As for now, I’ve been in the United Kingdom for over 23 years, it’s my home. But I still go back to Ukraine regularly. It’s a beautiful country with good, kind people. I want to see it become more like European countries. But, I don’t think it has to lose ties with Russia, we are similar people, it’s in our blood".

Career statistics

International goals

References

External links
Profile on the Pride of Anglia Website
St Johnstone fansite Blue Heaven's interview with Baltacha

 Sergei Pavlovich Baltacha – International Appearances

1958 births
Living people
Sportspeople from Mariupol
1982 FIFA World Cup players
FC Dynamo Kyiv players
Ukrainian emigrants to the United Kingdom
Footballers at the 1980 Summer Olympics
Inverness Caledonian Thistle F.C. managers
Inverness Caledonian Thistle F.C. players
Ipswich Town F.C. players
FC Metalist Kharkiv players
Olympic bronze medalists for the Soviet Union
Olympic footballers of the Soviet Union
Scottish Football League players
Soviet footballers
Soviet Top League players
Soviet Union international footballers
St Johnstone F.C. players
English Football League players
UEFA Euro 1988 players
Ukrainian football managers
Ukrainian expatriate football managers
Ukrainian footballers
Ukrainian expatriate footballers
Expatriate footballers in England
Expatriate footballers in Scotland
Expatriate football managers in Scotland
Soviet expatriate footballers
Soviet expatriate sportspeople in England
Soviet expatriate sportspeople in Scotland
Ukrainian expatriate sportspeople in Scotland
Olympic medalists in football
Caledonian F.C. players
Scottish Football League managers
Charlton Athletic F.C. non-playing staff
Medalists at the 1980 Summer Olympics
Association football defenders
Association football coaches
Recipients of the Order of Merit (Ukraine), 3rd class